Roseline Sonayee Konya is  a Nigerian  academic and a politician from Khana, Rivers State. She is a professor of Toxicology and Pharmacology at the University of Port Harcourt. She served as Commissioner for Environment in the cabinet of Governor Peter Odili and was re-appointed to same office in the cabinet of Governor Ezenwo Nyesom Wike. She was also the Chairman of Civil Service Commission in 1997.

Background and Education                                                                                                                                         

Born in Buan, Khana Local Government Area of Rivers State, Nigeria. Professor Konya attended St Arthur's Anglican Primary School, Buan from there she moved on to Mercy Secondary School, Okigwe (in present-day Imo State, Nigeria) for her secondary education. This was however disrupted by the Nigerian civil war, which began in late 1967. In 1968, while the war was still raging, she got enrolled into Holy Rosary Secondary School, Port Harcourt where she continued her secondary school education until 1969. From 1970 to 1971, she pursued studies for her A-level in St. Anne's School, Ibadan, from where she proceeded to The Council for National Academic Awards  (CNAA), UK, where she obtained her B.Sc. in Science in 1976 and in 1977 obtained a master's degree from Loughborough University. In 1984, Konya rounded off her Doctorate Degree programme in Brunel University, London.

Career 
Konya began her career as an Assistant Lecturer in the University of Port Harcourt in 1979, after which she moved on to Brunel University, U.K where she obtained her PhD. She returned to Nigeria in 1984 and continued as a lecturer in the University of Port Harcourt. Before being appointed as the Rivers State Commissioner for Environment, she held several positions and these include:

 Chairman, Protocol Subcommittee of Convocation Committee (1990)
 Director, Delta Rubber Company (1991–1993)
 Commissioner, Civil Service Commission (1993–1996)
 Chairman, Civil Service Commission (1997–1999)
 HOD, Animal and Environmental Biology Department (2001–2003)
 Member, Academic Advisory Board, Institute of Petroleum Studies (IPS)
 Dean, School of Graduate Studies
 Pioneer Provost, School of Graduate Studies
In the year 2003, Konya got promoted to the position of Professor of Animal and Environmental Biology.

She is the chairman, Technical Committee for the implementation of the Recommendations of the Rivers State Government Report on Soot

Awards 

 The Distinguished Leadership Award in Environmental Technology by the British Society of Commerce in recognition of meritorious achievements and leadership prominence in 2004.
 She was cited in the WHO IS WHO for Excellence in Management Intelligence Special Merit Award in October, 2008
 Merit Award by Animal and Environmental Biology Students Association as Most Outstanding Lecturer - September, 2010
 Award by the Committee of Deans and Provosts of Post Graduate School (CDPGS) in Nigeria – December, 2012

Personal life 
Roseline Konya was married to the late Barido Konya, with whom she had three children

She is the pioneer chairman of the Methodist Knights Council – Port Harcourt Archdiocese; and the first female Methodist Knight in Rivers and Bayelsa States.

References

Commissioners of ministries of Rivers State
First Wike Executive Council
Educators from Rivers State
Academic staff of the University of Port Harcourt
People from Khana
Nigerian environmentalists
Nigerian women environmentalists
Nigerian toxicologists
Year of birth missing (living people)
Nigerian women academics
Scientists from Rivers State
Living people
21st-century Nigerian women politicians
21st-century Nigerian politicians
Women government ministers of Nigeria